Turriscala is an extinct genus of small to medium-sized pelagic or planktonic sea snails, marine gastropod molluscs in the family Epitoniidae.

Species
 † Turriscala cylindrella (Suter, 1917) 
 † Turriscala discors (P. A. Maxwell, 1988) 
 † Turriscala finlayi P. A. Maxwell, 1992 
 † Turriscala germanica Lozouet, 1999 
 † Turriscala kaiparaensis Laws, 1939
 † Turriscala powelli Marwick, 1931 
 † Turriscala torulosa (Brocchi, 1814)

References

 J. J. Sepkoski. 2002. A compendium of fossil marine animal genera. Bulletins of American Paleontology 363:1-560 
 G. Wienrich. 2001. Die Fauna des marinen Miozäns von Kevelaer (Niederrhein). Gastropoda bis Cancellariidae 3:385-639 

Epitoniidae